Left Hand (also Justices, Knights, or Lefthand) is an unincorporated community in southeastern Roane County, West Virginia, United States.  It lies along West Virginia Route 36 southeast of the city of Spencer, the county seat of Roane County. Its post office  is still active.
 
The community was named after nearby Lefthand Run creek.

Education

An elementary school "Geary Elementary/Middle School" is located in Left Hand, West Virginia.

Gallery

References

Unincorporated communities in Roane County, West Virginia
Unincorporated communities in West Virginia